Historia Ecclesiastica (Latin, meaning "Church History") is the name of many different works, documenting the history of Christianity, including: 

Alexander Natalis
Bartholomew of Lucca, Historia Ecclesiastica Nova
Bede, Historia ecclesiastica gentis Anglorum
Eusebius of Caesarea, Historia Ecclesiastica (4th century)
Evagrius Scholasticus
Tyrannius Rufinus, translating Eusebius
Orderic Vitalis#The Historia Ecclesiastica
Socrates Scholasticus
Sozomen
Theodoret

See also
Ecclesiastical History (disambiguation)
Church History (disambiguation)

History of Christianity texts